Dock Hill Road Extension Stone Arch Bridge is a historic stone arch bridge located at Cornwall on Hudson in Orange County, New York. It was built about 1870.

It was listed on the National Register of Historic Places in 2010.

References

Road bridges on the National Register of Historic Places in New York (state)
Bridges completed in 1870
Bridges in Orange County, New York
National Register of Historic Places in Orange County, New York
Stone arch bridges in the United States